Horace Marden Albright (January 6, 1890 – March 28, 1987) was an American conservationist.

Horace Albright was born in 1890 in Bishop, California, the son of George Albright, a miner. He graduated from the University of California, Berkeley in 1912, and earned a law degree from Georgetown University. Albright married his college classmate Grace Noble and they had two children.

After graduation, he worked for the Department of the Interior in Washington, D.C. Albright became a legal assistant to Stephen Mather when Mather became Assistant Secretary in charge of National Parks, and later assisted Mather when the National Park Service (NPS) was established in 1916. As legal assistant he helped acquire land for several new national parks in the east. When Mather became ill, Albright managed the NPS as acting director. He later served as superintendent of Yellowstone National Park and, for a short time, Yosemite National Park. On October 18, 1922, he was elected Associate Member of the Boone and Crockett Club, a wildlife conservation organization founded by Theodore Roosevelt and George Bird Grinnell, in 1887.

On January 12, 1929, Albright succeeded Mather as the second director of the NPS and held the post until August 9, 1933. In 1933 Albright resigned to work for the U.S. Potash Corporation and U.S. Borax and Chemical Corporation, serving variously as director, vice president, and general manager. During this time they lived in New Rochelle, New York. In 1937, his portrait was painted by artist Herbert A. Collins.

In 1969, Albright received the National Audubon Society's highest honor, the Audubon Medal.

The nation's highest civilian award, the Presidential Medal of Freedom, was awarded to Albright by President Jimmy Carter on the 64th anniversary of the National Park Service. President Carter announced the award in August 1980, and the medal was presented on December 8 by Assistant Secretary of the Interior Robert L. Herbst, in a ceremony at Van Nuys, California.

Albright died in Van Nuys, California, in 1987.

Albright Grove, a grove of old-growth hemlocks and tulip poplars located in the Great Smoky Mountains National Park, was named in Albright's honor. The Albright Training Center at Grand Canyon National Park, the Albright Visitor Center at Yellowstone National Park, and Albright Peak in Grand Teton National Park also bear his name.

References

Further reading
 Becher, Anne, and Joseph Richey, American Environmental Leaders: From Colonial Times to the Present (2 vol, 2nd ed. 2008) vol 1 online p. 15.

External links 
 
 National Park Service Biography
 "Oh, Ranger!" by Horace M. Albright and Frank J. Taylor (1928, 1929, 1934, 1972). Whimsical look at managing the National parks
Creating the National Park Service: The Missing Years by Horace M. Albright and Marian Albright Schenck (Univ. of OK Press, 1999) Memoirs about creating the NPS written with the assistance of Albright's daughter
Albright, Horace M. as told to Robert Cahn; The Birth of the National Park Service; The Founding Years, 1913–33; Howe Brothers, Salt Lake City, Utah; 1985.
Horace M. Albright, Mining Lawyer and Executive. 1986 interview,   Oral History Office, University of California, Berkeley. Accessed 8/16/2017

1890 births
1987 deaths
People from Bishop, California
Activists from New Rochelle, New York
Directors of the National Park Service
Georgetown University Law Center alumni
University of California, Berkeley alumni
Presidential Medal of Freedom recipients
Sierra Club awardees